The Reformed Presbyterian Church of Central and Eastern Europe (RPCEE) is a Presbyterian denomination in Hungary, Slovakia, Romania and Ukraine. It split from the Reformed Church in Hungary in 1998, and has 27 congregations.

The Károlyi Gáspár Institute of Theology and Missions (KGTMI) had started in 1992, but in 1997 the Consultative Synod of the Reformed Church in Hungary expelled the seminary and all its students. The RPCEE was formed the following year, and adopted as its confessional standards the Second Helvetic Confession and Heidelberg Catechism, as well as the Westminster Confession, and Shorter and Larger Catechisms.

References

External links
 

Reformed denominations in Europe
Christian organizations established in 1998
Calvinist denominations established in the 20th century
Presbyterianism in Hungary
Protestantism in Romania